Yiannakis Yiangoudakis (born January 17, 1959) is a former Cyprus international football midfielder. During his career, he played in three international cups with Apollon Limassol. These include the 1991-92 European Cup, the 1993-94 UEFA Cup, and the 1994-95 UEFA Cup.

References

External links

1959 births
Living people
Cypriot footballers
Cyprus international footballers
Apollon Limassol FC players
Association football midfielders
Cypriot football managers
 Apollon Limassol FC managers
Sportspeople from Limassol